This is a list of trains run by Indian Railways.

A

B

C

D

E
East Bengal Express
East Bengal Mail
East Coast Express (India)
Ernad Express
Ernakulam–H.Nizamuddin Duronto Express
Ernakulam–Okha Express
Ernakulum–Banglore City Intercity Express

F
Faizabad Delhi Express
Faizabad Superfast Express
Falaknuma Express
Farakka Express (via Sultanpur)
Firozpur Janata Express
Flying Ranee

G

H

I

J

K

L

M

N

O
Odisha Sampark Kranti Express

P

R

S

T

U

V

W
Wainganga Superfast Express
West Bengal Sampark Kranti Express
West Coast Express (India)

Y
Yelagiri Express
Yercaud Express
Yesvantpur–Ahmedabad Weekly Express
Yeshvantapur–Delhi Sarai Rohilla AC Duronto Express
Yesvantpur–Kamakhya AC Superfast Express
Yesvantpur–Howrah Superfast Express
Yoga Express

Z
Ziyarat Express

See also

 List of railway stations in India

References

External links

Trains run by Indian Railways
Lists of named passenger trains